The 2013 BNP Paribas Primrose Bordeaux was a professional tennis tournament played on clay courts. It was the sixth edition of the tournament which was part of the 2013 ATP Challenger Tour. It took place in Bordeaux, France between 13 and 19 May 2013.

Singles main draw entrants

Seeds

 1 Rankings are as of May 6, 2013.

Other entrants
The following players received wildcards into the singles main draw:
  Pierre-Hugues Herbert
  Gaël Monfils
  Josselin Ouanna
  Florent Serra

The following players received entry as an alternate into the singles main draw:
  Denis Kudla

The following players received entry from the qualifying draw:
  Facundo Bagnis
  Pablo Carreño Busta
  Jonathan Dasnières de Veigy
  Mikhail Kukushkin

The following player received entry as a lucky loser:
  Michał Przysiężny

Doubles main draw entrants

Seeds

 1 Rankings are as of May 6, 2013.

Other entrants
The following pairs received wildcards into the doubles main draw:
  Marc Gicquel /  Romain Jouan
  Pierre-Hugues Herbert /  Nicolas Renavand
  Josselin Ouanna /  Laurent Rochette

The following pair received entry using a protected ranking:
  Eduardo Schwank /  João Souza

Champions

Singles

 Gaël Monfils def.  Michaël Llodra, 7–5, 7–6(7–5)

Doubles

 Christopher Kas /  Oliver Marach def.  Nicholas Monroe /  Simon Stadler, 2–6, 6–4, [10–1]

External links
Official Website

BNP Paribas Primrose Bordeaux
BNP Paribas Primrose Bordeaux
2013 in French tennis